The year 1913 in architecture involved some significant events.

Buildings and structures

Work on Gartenstadt Falkenberg (Tuschkastensiedlung, "Paintbox Estate") in Bohnsdorf, earliest of the Berlin Modernism Housing Estates (Siedlungen der Berliner Moderne), begins to a design by Bruno Taut.

Buildings

 February 1 – Grand Central Terminal, rebuilt, re-opens in New York City, United States.
 April 24 – The Woolworth Building opens in New York City, United States, designed by Cass Gilbert; the tallest building in the world at this date (1913 until 1930).

 May 20 – Centennial Hall in Breslau (Wrocław), designed by Max Berg.
 May 26 – Campbeltown Picture House (cinema) opens in Scotland, designed by Albert V. Gardner.
 May 31 – The Carol I Mosque (today known as the Grand Mosque of Constanța) in Constanța, Romania, designed by George Constantinescu, is inaugurated.
 July 20 – New Town Hall (Hanover), designed by Hermann Eggert and Gustav Halmhuber, opened. 
 October 18 – Monument to the Battle of the Nations at Leipzig, designed by Bruno Schmitz, is inaugurated.
 Sinaia railway station in Sinaia, Romania.
 City Federal Building in Birmingham, Alabama, the tallest building in Alabama until 1969.
 Alberta Legislature Building in Edmonton, Alberta completed. 
 Union Buildings, Pretoria, Union of South Africa, by Herbert Baker, completed.
 Church of the Holy Spirit, Vienna, by Jože Plečnik, completed.
 Kelling Hall, Norfolk, England, designed by Edward Maufe, completed.
 Scheu House and Horner House, Vienna, both designed by Adolf Loos, completed.
 Heijplaat worker's housing for Rotterdamsche Droogdok Maatschappij in the Netherlands, planned by Herman Ambrosius Jan Baanders, is begun.
 Interiors of Café Capua, Herrenmodesalon Kniže and Bridge-Club-Wien, Vienna, all designed by Adolf Loos, completed.
 Halenbrücke concrete open-spandrel arch bridge over Aare between Bern and Kirchlindach in Switzerland.

Publications
 Adolf Loos' Ornament and Crime is first published.

Awards
 RIBA Royal Gold Medal – Reginald Blomfield.
 Grand Prix de Rome, architecture: Roger Séassal.

Births
 May 20 – H. T. Cadbury-Brown, English architect (died 2009)
 September 4 – Kenzō Tange, Japanese architect (died 2005)
 October 20 – Alejandro de la Sota, Spanish architect (died 1996)
 October 25 – Raymond Berg, Australian architect (died 1989)
 November 2 – Erik Asmussen, Danish-born architect (died 1998)

Deaths
 May 30 – John Oldrid Scott, English architect (born 1841)
 August 27 — Charles Babcock, American Architect (born 1829)
 November 8 – John Belcher, English architect (born 1841)
 November 28 – George B. Post, American architect (born 1837)

References